Chengdu Zoo is a zoo located in Chengdu, China. It is home to around 3,000 animals representing 300 species and is China's fourth largest zoo.

Description
The Chengdu Zoo's biggest attraction are giant pandas and they house three of them. The zoo provides a relatively poor condition for its animals, most live in enclosed areas. The zoo was opened in 1953, it moved to its current location in 1976. The zoo is 43 acres large and has bred 58 giant pandas in all.

References

1953 establishments in China
Zoos in China
Parks in Chengdu